The Floréal class is a type of light "surveillance frigates" designed for the needs of the French Navy in low-threat environments ordered in 1989. The ships are named after months of the Republican Calendar. They use construction standards of commercial ships. The frigates were built between 1990 and 1993 by the Chantiers de l'Atlantique at Saint-Nazaire, France.

The ships' main armament was two Exocet MM38 surface-to-surface missiles and a  CADAM turret, but in 2014, the Exocets were removed at the end of their life cycle. The vessels are used mainly to patrol the French overseas departments and regions in the Pacific, Indian Ocean and Caribbean regions, but have served in both military and humanitarian operations in the Persian Gulf and the Gulf of Guinea.

Two more ships were ordered by the Royal Moroccan Navy in July 1999. Constructed by Chantiers de l'Atlantique in 2001–2002, they resemble the French vessels with minor changes. Their main armament are the two Exocet missiles and a Otobreda  gun.

Design and description

The Floréal class evolved out of a need to produce a cheaper frigate for patrol in the low-threat environments of France's territorial waters and exclusive economic zone. The hull and superstructure are made of welded steel with transverse bulkheads. Due to the frigates' broad beams, they are equipped with fin stabilisers.

The frigates are powered by a combined diesel and diesel (CODAD) system comprising four SEMT Pielstick 6 PA6 L280 BPC diesel engines driving two shafts each turning a LIPS controllable pitch propeller. The CODAD system is rated at  The vessels are also equipped with one  bow thruster. They also have twin rudders. Due to the mercantile construction design, the four diesels are all located within one machinery room for ease of maintenance. Both diesel fuel and TR5 aviation fuel is brought aboard at a single location at the stern compared to naval-constructed vessels which sport two. The ships also have three  diesel-electric generators located just fore and aft of the machinery room.

The class was initially only to be armed with the weaponry that would be required for the patrol mission, but this was later increased. The frigates were armed with two Exocet MM38 surface-to-surface missiles in launchers situated centrally atop the midships superstructure. However, at the end of the missile's life cycle in 2014, the launchers were removed as the French Navy did not intend to replace the capability aboard the ships. The ships mount one 100 mm CADAM turret with the Najir fire control system located forwards. The frigates are equipped with DRBV-21C (Mars) air sentry, Racal Decca RM1290 navigation and Racal Decca RM1290 landing radars along with ARBG-1A Saïgon communications intercept, CSF ARBR 16A radar intercept electronic surveillance systems and two Dagaie decoy systems. 

Ships of the Floréal class mount a  helicopter landing pad located on the stern and a  hangar. The frigates are capable of operating the embarked Eurocopter AS565 Panther up to sea state 5, and are capable of operating helicopters up to the size of the Eurocopter AS332 Super Puma. However, as late as 2021, Aérospatiale Alouette III helicopters were also being embarked, notably in the Pacific region. In 2022, the Eurocopter Dauphin N3 was earmarked to replace the Aérospatiale Alouette III aboard some ships when the Alouette IIIs were withdrawn from service. The vessels have a complement of 90 including the aircrew and officers and 24 marines with capacity for a further 13 personnel. The ships are equipped with improved medical facilities including a consultation room and hospital beds for use during humanitarian missions.

Construction

The first two ships were ordered on 20 January 1989, the second pair on 9 January 1990 and the final two in January 1991. The ships are named after months of the Republican Calendar.  The ships were built by Chantiers de l'Atlantique at Saint-Nazaire, France. They were built using civilian construction methods as a cost saving measure. The reduction in cost allowed the French Navy to build three for the price of one . This method was also used for the later La Fayette class. Following sea trials, the vessels were sent to Arsenal de Lorient at Lorient to have their weapons installed.

Ships in class

Service
The Floréal-class frigates main purpose for the French Navy is to patrol and support French forces in the French overseas departments and regions. The vessels can also be used for humanitarian missions, ship escort and special missions. Floréal and Nivôse are based at Réunion, Vendémiaire at Nouméa, Prairial at Tahiti and Ventôse and Germinal at Martinique. The frigates have served in military operations as part of the Australian-led INTERFET, in Operation Enduring Freedom in the Persian Gulf and in Operation Atalanta off the coast of Somalia. They have served in hurricane relief forces, and recovery operations for crashed aircraft.

It is anticipated that the class will be replaced in French service in the 2030s with the planned European Patrol Corvette.

Export variants

Royal Moroccan Navy

The two frigates are named after the late Kings Mohammed V and Hassan II. They were acquired with three Panther helicopters in July 1999. The Moroccan frigates of the class are similar to those in French service with a few changes. The frigates are powered by a CODAD system comprising the same four SEMT Pielstick 6 PA6 L280 BPC diesel engines driving two shafts each turning a LIPS controllable pitch propeller. The CODAD system is rated at  The vessels are also equipped with one  bow thruster. Other differences include one Otobreda  gun turret with Najir fire control system located forwards instead of the French 100 mm gun. The frigates are capable of being armed with two 20 mm modèle F2 guns situated in atop the aft superstructure, but did not come with the weapons installed. In place of the  guns, the Moroccan Floréal-class frigates can be fitted with twin launchers for Simbad surface-to-air missiles. The Moroccan frigates are equipped with two Decca Bridgemaster radars, one for use as navigational radar, the other for helicopter control, and Thomsen-CSF ARBR 17 radar intercept electronic surveillance system.

Ships in class

Philippines
STX France revealed a modernized variant of the Floréal class that it was offering to the Philippine Navy in 2014.

See also
 List of naval ship classes in service

Citations

References

External links

  Floréal Class Frigate, France
  Forecast International: Floreal Class

Frigate classes
 
 
Frigates of Morocco
Ship classes of the French Navy